USNS Lt. Raymond O. Beaudoin (T-AP-189) was a troop transport that served with the United States Military Sea Transportation Service (MSTS) during the Korean War. Prior to her MSTS service, she served as a commercial vessel under the name SS Marshall Victory, and later with the US Army as USAT Lt. Raymond O. Beaudoin.

Laid down as the Victory ship SS Marshall Victory under Maritime Commission contract by Bethlehem‑Fairfield Shipyard, Inc of Baltimore, Maryland 4 April 1945, she was launched 21 May 1945; and delivered to her operator, J. H. Winchester & Company, 15 June 1945.

Commercial and army service
Owned by the Maritime Administration, she served on the merchant sealanes and later with the Army Transportation Service primarily in the Pacific. She was transferred by the Maritime Administration to the Navy 22 July 1950 and placed in service 1 August 1950.

MSTS service
Manned by a civilian crew, she operated under the control of MSTS and made supply runs and troop lifts between west coast ports and American bases in Japan and South Korea. From 20 April 1951 to 13 September 1952 she completed 20 deployments to Korean waters as a part of the vital seaborne supply line between Japan and Korea.

Deactivation
She was returned to the custody of the Maritime Administration 5 November 1952 and was placed in the National Defense Reserve Fleet in Puget Sound, Olympia, Washington. Her name was struck from the Navy List 22 December 1952. The ship was scrapped in 1972.

Awards
Lt. Raymond O. Beaudoin received four battle stars for service during the Korean War.

References
Lt. Raymond O. Beaudoin - DANFS Online.
T-AP-189 Lt. Raymond O. Beaudoin, Navsource Online.

World War II auxiliary ships of the United States
Ships built in Baltimore
1945 ships